This is a list of films which placed number-one at the box office in Australia during 2003. Amounts are in Australian dollars. This article transitions from weekend end date to week end date, thus accounting for the additional week (a total of 53). Also included are the positions at the box office other films opened at. Quite a number of these are films from the previous year due to normal Australian film distribution delays.

References
Urban Cinefile – Box Office

See also
 List of Australian films – Australian films by year
 2003 in film

2003
Australia
2003 in Australian cinema